Orthrus is a genus of Southeast Asian jumping spiders that was first described by Eugène Louis Simon in 1900. The name is derived from a two-headed dog in Greek mythology.

Species
 it contains four species, found only in Indonesia and the Philippines:
Orthrus bicolor Simon, 1900 (type) – Philippines
Orthrus calilungae Barrion, 1998 – Philippines
Orthrus muluensis Wanless, 1980 – Borneo
Orthrus palawanensis Wanless, 1980 – Philippines

References

External links

 Photograph of Orthrus sp.

Salticidae genera
Salticidae
Spiders of Asia